J-Euro Best is a compilation album, consisting of recordings by various Avex artists produced and/or remixed by various music producers mostly those of eurobeat from Italy, released in 2001 by Avex Trax.

As an album in the Super Eurobeat Presents : J-Euro series, J-Euro Best contained 14 tracks including ones sung by prominent Avex artists such as Ayumi Hamasaki, MAX and Every Little Thing.

J-Euro Best can be considered a greatest hits album, as the album consists of many smash hits in the 2000 "J-Euro" boom in the para para scene.

Track listing 
 Boys & Girls (A Eurobeat Mix) – Ayumi Hamasaki
 Ginga No Chikai (Eurobeat Mix) – MAX
 Survival Dance (No No Cry More) (Eurobeat Mix) – TRF
 Break Out! (Eurobeat Mix) – Nanase Aikawa
 Pray (Eurobeat Mix) – Every Little Thing
 Blazin' Beat (Eurobeat Mix) – Move
 Heartbeat – Passion 2000
 Private Wars (Euro Mix) – Dream
 Aishiattemasu (New Generation Mix) – Key-A-Kiss
 No.1 (Kagayake Otome) (DJ Shu's Light Mix3) – Tokyo Purin
 Deluxe (Eurobeat Mix) – Key-A-Kiss
 Fly High (Euro-Power Mix) – Ayumi Hamasaki
 Give Me A Shake (Euro-Power Mix) – MAX
 Freedom (Global Extended Mix) – Globe

References

2001 compilation albums